Khalik Allah (born 1985) is an American filmmaker and photographer. His 2015 documentary film Field Niggas and his 2017 book Souls Against the Concrete depict people who inhabit the notorious Harlem corner of 125th Street and Lexington Avenue in New York City. His film Black Mother (2018) depicts people on the island of Jamaica. "He favours visual portraits of people on the street – filming their faces for several seconds as they pose as if for a still camera." Khalik lives in Long Island and is a Nominee member of Magnum Photos.

Life and work
Khalik was born in Brookhaven, New York. His mother is Jamaican and his father is Iranian. He grew up in Suffolk, Long Island, New York, but moved between Queens and Harlem throughout his childhood. His parents met at university in Bristol, England. He is a dual Jamaican-American citizen.

He started making movies at age 19 with a Hi-8 video camera. His first feature film, Popa Wu: A 5% Story (2010), was a "normal, talking heads documentary" about Popa Wu, "Wu-Tang Clan's de facto spiritual advisor" and a member of Five-Percent Nation. It took four years to make. Khalik took up still photography in 2010.

In June 2020 he became a Nominee member of Magnum Photos.

Field Niggas

Described by The Village Voice as "more a woozy experience you press through than an ethnographic study you watch, Khalik Allah's hour-long non-narrative street-life doc Field Niggas stands as the most striking sort of urban portraiture." The film comprises observational footage of, and interviews and discussions with, people at night around the notorious Harlem street corner of 125th Street and Lexington Avenue in New York City. Its subjects are predominantly African American, experiencing poverty, homelessness, drug addiction, and harassment from the police; people with "a hunger to have their voices heard". The police are also portrayed.

The film's title is taken from "Message to the Grass Roots", a public speech delivered by human rights activist Malcolm X in 1963, "extolling the spirit of rebellion among outdoor slaves." The film was made in summer 2014, filmed using a handheld camera. Apart from the cinematography, it includes surveillance footage of the strangulation of Eric Garner as well as the overdubbed sound of field hollers by a 1950s chain gang.

Khalik released the film for free on YouTube and Vimeo in 2015 for a short time, before removing it at the request of True/False Film Festival so it could show there. It has since been shown on the film festival and college circuits in the US and Europe.

Souls Against the Concrete
Souls Against the Concrete consists of Khalik's photographs of people at night around the intersection of 125th Street and Lexington Avenue in New York City, between 2012 and 2016.

Khalik used slow-speed color film, usually intended for daylight photography, for its high contrast, with a 35 mm SLR camera from 1971. Because of photographing at night using available light, he used a fast manual focus normal lens at a large aperture (hence the shallow depth of field).

Black Mother
Black Mother was made in Jamaica, its subjects are holy men, sex workers, beggars, hawkers and children. It was made in the same fashion as Field Niggas: "visual portraits of people on the street – filming their faces for several seconds as they pose as if for a still camera" – with a soundtrack out of synch with the images.

Khalik used a Panasonic Lumix DMC-GH3 digital camera, and Super 8, Super 16 and Bolex film cameras.

Publications
Souls Against the Concrete. Austin: University of Texas, 2017. .

Films

Documentary films
Popa Wu: A 5% Story (2010) – 1 hr
Antonyms of Beauty (2013) – 27 mins
Field Niggas (2015) – 1 hr
Black Mother (2018) – 1 hr 17 mins
IWOW: I Walk On Water (2020) – 3 hrs 20 mins

Short films
Urban Rashomon
Khamaica

Music videos
The Razah Code Underground Hip-Hop Chapter 1

Films with contributions by Khalik
Lemonade (2016) – 46 mins, about Beyoncé, produced by Good Company and Jonathan Lia, premiered on HBO – Khalik was second unit director and cinematographer

See also
I'm Waiting for the Man

Notes

References

External links

1985 births
Living people
African-American film directors
African-American photographers
American people of Iranian descent
American people of Jamaican descent
Five percenters
People from Brookhaven, New York
Magnum photographers
21st-century American photographers
21st-century African-American artists
20th-century African-American people